Chob Yodkaew (died 1 May 2013) was a Thai economist and politician appointed Senator for the Southern region.

He died of a stroke on May 1, 2013.

See also
Politics of Thailand

References

2013 deaths
Chob Yodkaew
Year of birth missing